The office of Mayor of Rock Island, Illinois has existed since the Rock Island's incorporation in 1841 with Benjamin Barrett serving as the city's first mayor. Rock Island adopted a Mayor-Council form of government. It held that form of government for the next 110 years when in 1952 the city adopted a new popular form of city government, the council-manager form. Carl F. Bauer was elected as the first mayor under this form in 1953. This form of government still elected a mayor but the mayor is nothing more than a figurehead whereas the true power lay in the hands of the City Council and City Manager.

The Rock Island mayoralty is a ceremonial position that is often used as a stepping stone for higher political office. Most of Rock Island's mayors did not go far past the mayoralty but a few did, mostly running for State Representative, State Senator, and U.S. Congress. Rock Island held partisan election throughout much of its history. For a brief time from 1911 to 1923, Rock Island's mayor served as a non-partisan mayor; then again in 1923 the City went back to partisan elections. The Republican Party has dominated the mayoralty, the city had more Republican mayors than Democratic mayors. In 1953 when the city adopted the Council-Manager form of government the city once again went to non-partisan elections and it continues to this day.

In 1984 a referendum appeared on the city ballot asking whether voters wanted to adopt partisan elections or continue with non-partisan elections, the referendum was defeated by an overwhelming margin.

Rock Island mayors
Rock Island's mayors since the city's first mayoral election in 1849:

References

Rock Island, Illinois, USA
Mayors
 
1841 establishments in Illinois